The Ministry of Finance is the government department responsible for Greece's public finances. The incumbent minister is Christos Staikouras of New Democracy.

Minister's role

According to Article 73 of the Constitution of Greece, any bills relating to pensions must be submitted by the Minister of Finance. According to Article 75 of the Constitution, any bill relating to expenditure or a reduction in revenue must not be introduced unless accompanied by a special report on the bill, signed by the Minister of Finance. Finally, according to Article 79 of the Constitution, the Minister of Finance must bring the budget before the Hellenic Parliament at least one month before the start of the fiscal year, for it to be voted on.

Lists of Ministers

List of Ministers of Finance (1967–2000)

List of Ministers of Economy and Finance (2000–2009)

List of Ministers of Finance (since 2009)

See also
Bank of Greece

References

External links

Official Site of the Ministry of Finance

Government ministries of Greece
Lists of government ministers of Greece
Greece
Finance in Greece